Yorktown High School is a four star and National Blue Ribbon high school located in Yorktown, Indiana. It is managed by the Yorktown Community School Corporation.

The school was one of the six 'Head of Class' selections by the Indiana Chamber Of Commerce, for 2005, for their exemplary efforts. The six schools were selected from the 345 high schools in the state.

Athletics
The school is a member of the Hoosier Heritage Conference. Their mascot is the tiger.

The school offers the following IHSAA sanctioned sports:

 Baseball
 Boys' Basketball
 Girls' Basketball
 Boys' Cross Country
 Girls' Cross Country
 Football
 Boys' Golf
State champs - 1974
 Girls' Golf
State champs - 1976, 2012
 Boys' Soccer
 Girls' Soccer
 Softball
 Boys' Swimming and Diving
 Girls' Swimming and Diving
 Boys' Tennis
 Girls' Tennis
 Boys' Track and Field
 Girls' Track and Field
 Volleyball
State champs - 2000, 2011, 2016, 2018, 2020
 Wrestling

See also
 List of high schools in Indiana

References

External links
 Official site

Public high schools in Indiana
Schools in Delaware County, Indiana